Johann Heinrich Bisterfeld (1605 – 16 February 1655) was a German philosopher, logician and encyclopedic writer from Siegen. A follower of Ramus and pupil of Johann Heinrich Alsted at the Herborn Academy (Academia Nassauensis), Bisterfeld became head of the academy in Weissenburg (Alba Iulia) in Transylvania, where he died.

Works
 Philosophiae primae seminarium, 1652 ( second edition: Lugduni Batavorum, 1657).
 Elementorum logicorum libri tres, Lugduni Batavorum, 1657.
 Bisterfeldius redivivus, Hagae-Comitum, 1661, appeared posthumously in two volumes, the first being Alphabeti philosophici libri tres, on universal language and the second Logica disputandi; this work is considered an influence on Leibniz.

Notes

External links

 The Correspondence of Johann Heinrich Bisterfeld in EMLO
 Biographical 

1605 births
1655 deaths
German academics
German encyclopedists
German philosophers
People from Siegen
17th-century German writers
17th-century philosophers
German male non-fiction writers
17th-century German male writers